Therese Borssén, (born 12 December 1984) in Rättvik, is a Swedish former skier specialized in slalom. Her first World Cup win came in Semmering, on 29 December 2006. She resides in Rättvik and Stockholm.

Therese participated in the 2006 Winter Olympics in Torino and finished 8th in slalom. She also won the Readers' Handbook Award.

On 30 January 2013, she announced her retirement following the 2012–2013 season.

World Cup competition victories

References

Therese Borssén ended her career

1984 births
Living people
People from Rättvik Municipality
Swedish female alpine skiers
Olympic alpine skiers of Sweden
Alpine skiers at the 2006 Winter Olympics
Alpine skiers at the 2010 Winter Olympics
Sportspeople from Dalarna County
21st-century Swedish women